2016–17 1. FC Köln season is the 2016–17 for the German football club.

Background

Disciplinary record

References

1. FC Köln seasons
Koln